A list of windmills in the German state of Saxony-Anhalt.

Windmills
Saxony-Anhalt
Tourist attractions in Saxony-Anhalt